Povkh or Povh is a surname. Notable people with the surname include:
Ksenja Povh (born 1987), Slovenian footballer
Olesya Povh (born 1987), Ukrainian sprint athlete
Mariya Povkh (born 1989), Ukrainian canoeist

Ukrainian-language surnames